The Telegraph, Daily Telegraph, Sunday Telegraph and other variant names are popular names for newspapers. Newspapers with these titles include:

Australia
 The Telegraph (Adelaide), a newspaper in Adelaide, South Australia, published 1867–1922
 The Daily Telegraph (Sydney), New South Wales, founded 1879
 The Sunday Telegraph (Sydney), its weekend publication
 Daily Telegraph (Melbourne), Victoria, published 1869–1892
 The Daily Telegraph (Launceston), Tasmania, published 1883–1928
 The Telegraph (Brisbane), Queensland, published 1872–1988
 The Daily Telegraph and North Murchison and Pilbarra Gazette, Meekatharra, Western Australia, published 1909–1947
 Prahran Telegraph, Melbourne, Victoria, published 1860–1930
 The Shoalhaven Telegraph, Nowra, New South Wales, published 1879–1937

Canada
 Telegraph-Journal, Saint John, New Brunswick
 The Toronto Daily Telegraph, published 1866–1872

United Kingdom
 The Daily Telegraph, commonly called The Telegraph, a broadsheet newspaper founded in 1855
 The Sunday Telegraph, Sunday printed edition, founded 1961
 Telegraph.co.uk, The Telegraph, an online newspaper, with reports from the two above, plus original content
 The Telegraph (magazine), Bob Dylan fanzine, published 1981–1997
 Belfast Telegraph, Northern Ireland
 Community Telegraph, Northern Ireland, published 2007–2013
 Coventry Telegraph, England
 Derby Telegraph, England
 Greenock Telegraph, Scotland
 Grimsby Telegraph, a regional newspaper
 Jewish Telegraph, a Jewish newspaper
 Lancashire Telegraph, East Lancashire, England
 Sheffield Telegraph, England
 Telegraph & Argus, Bradford, England

United States
 The Telegraph (Alton, Illinois), founded 1836
 The Telegraph (Macon, Georgia), founded 1826
 The Telegraph (Nashua, New Hampshire), New Hampshire, founded 1832
 Bluefield Daily Telegraph, Bluefield, West Virginia
 Civilian & Telegraph, Cumberland, Maryland, published 1859–1905
 Durango Telegraph, Colorado
 Spiritual Telegraph, New York City, published 1852–1860
 Telegraph and Texas Register, Houston, published 1835–1877
 Telegraph Herald, Dubuque, Iowa
 The Catholic Telegraph, Cincinnati, Ohio

Elsewhere
 Telegraph (Bulgarian newspaper), a Bulgarian national daily newspaper published in Sofia
 The Telegraph (India), is an Indian national daily newspaper founded in 1982
 The Daily Telegraph (Napier, New Zealand), New Zealand, published 1871–1999
 De Telegraaf, Dutch newspaper, founded 1893
 Hongkong Telegraph, Hong Kong newspaper published 1881–1924
 The Connaught Telegraph, Castlebar, County Mayo, Ireland
 Telegrafi, Kosovo

See also
 Telegraph (disambiguation)
 Evening Telegraph, a list of newspapers with that title
 Morning Telegraph, a list of newspapers with that title
 
 
 
 
 
 

Lists of newspapers